The Republic of Aras (also known as the Republic of Araks or the Araxi Republic) was a short-lived and unrecognized state in the South Caucasus, roughly corresponding with the territory that is now the Nakhchivan Autonomous Republic of Azerbaijan. Named after the Aras River that formed its southern border, the republic was declared in December 1918 by Jafargulu Khan Nakhchivanski with support from the Azerbaijan Democratic Republic's ruling party, the Musavat Party, and the government of the Ottoman Empire.

The creation of the Republic of Aras was in response to a border proposal by Sir John Oliver Wardrop, British Chief Commissioner in the South Caucasus, that would have assigned the area to the First Republic of Armenia. Its existence was ended when troops from Armenia advanced into the region and succeeded in taking control over it in mid-June 1919 during the Aras War. However, this triggered an advance into the Nakhchivan region by the army of the Azerbaijan Republic and Ottoman Empire, and by the end of July Armenia had lost control of the region.

See also
 First Armenian Republic
 Azerbaijan Democratic Republic
 Nakhchivan Autonomous Republic
 Armenian-Azerbaijani War

References

1918 establishments in Asia
1919 disestablishments in Asia
20th century in Armenia
20th century in Azerbaijan
Former republics
Former unrecognized countries
History of Nakhchivan
Modern history of Azerbaijan
Post–Russian Empire states
States and territories established in 1918
States and territories disestablished in 1919